Volumes, 1 & 2 is a pair of EPs by Brent Smith and Zach Myers of American rock band Shinedown. Volume 1 was released on October 9, 2020, while Volume 2 was released on October 23, 2020. Both EPs were released via Atlantic. These are the first EPs by Smith and Myers to feature a mixture of acoustic covers and originals by the duo along with additional instruments such as a piano, unlike the previous EP which featured only acoustic guitars and all cover songs on the disc. The first two songs released by the duo features one original song entitled "Not Mad Enough" and one cover track originally by Neil Young called "Rockin' in the Free World". Both songs were released via YouTube and all streaming platforms on August 21, 2020.

Production
Smith and Myers again let their fans vote on songs that they want to have them cover, as with the previous EP, but this time voting took place on their main page instead of having them vote via Facebook.

Track listing

Personnel
 Brent Smith – lead vocals, co-lead vocals on "Never Tear Us Apart"
 Zach Myers – guitar, piano, lead vocals on "Never Tear Us Apart" and "Don't Look Back in Anger"

Production
 Paris Visone – director for "Not Mad Enough" and "One More Time" videos 
 Sanjay Parikh — director for "Bad Guy" & "Panic!" videos

References

2020 EPs
Shinedown albums
Atlantic Records EPs